Norwood Lake is a man-made lake located by Norwood, New York. Fish species present in the reservoir are smallmouth bass, northern pike, rock bass, yellow perch, and walleye. There is a carry down boat launch located on Riverside Road.

References 

Lakes of New York (state)